Enrico Fermi (1901–1954), an Italian-born, naturalized American physicist, is the eponym of the topics listed below.

Physics
Fermi (unit), unit of length in particle physics equivalent to the femtometre

Fermi arc, a phenomenon in superconductivity
Fermi constant, constant that gives the strength of Fermi's interaction
Fermi contact interaction, the magnetic interaction between an electron and an atomic nucleus when the electron is inside that nucleus
Fermi energy
Fermi's four factor formula
Fermi gas
Fermi's interaction, an explanation of the beta decay
Fermi level
Fermi liquid theory
 Quasi Fermi level, also called imref which is "fermi" spelt backwards
Fermi heap and Fermi hole
Fermi paradox, a fundamental issue in SETI
Fermi point
Fermi pseudopotential
Fermi's golden rule
Fermi motion, the quantum motion of nucleons bound inside a nucleus
Fermi resonance
Fermi surface
Fermi acceleration
Fermi–Ulam model
Fermi–Pustyl'nikov model, a model of the Fermi acceleration mechanism
Fermi glow
Fermi ball
Fermi sea
Fermi transition
Fermi–Walker transport
Fermi–Dirac statistics
Fermi–Dirac condensate
Fermion, the class of particles that obey Fermi-Dirac statistics, a name coined by Dirac in 1945
Fermium, a synthetic element with symbol Fm and atomic number 100. 
Fermionic field
Thomas–Fermi model approximation
Thomas–Fermi model
Thomas–Fermi equation
Thomas–Fermi screening, an approximate method for describing screening of electric field by mobile charge
International School of Physics "Enrico Fermi", an annual summer school hosted by the Italian Physical Society

Mathematics
Complete Fermi–Dirac integral
Incomplete Fermi–Dirac integral
Fermi–Walker differentiation
Fermi coordinates, local coordinates that are adapted to a geodesic in Riemannian geometry
Fermi–Pasta–Ulam–Tsingou problem
Fermi problem, estimation problem designed to teach dimensional analysis, and approximation
Fermi paradox, typical example of a Fermi problem pertaining to extraterrestrial civilizations

Research
Fermilab, Fermi National Accelerator Laboratory
Enrico Fermi Institute, Chicago, Illinois
 FeRMI, a research federation in Toulouse, France

Technology
GeForce 400 Series and GeForce 500 Series, also "Fermi", the codename for a CUDA architecture graphics card developed by NVIDIA
Fermi Gamma-ray Space Telescope
Enrico Fermi Nuclear Generating Station, Monroe, Michigan
Enrico Fermi Nuclear Power Plant (Italy), Trino Vercellese, Italy
RA-1 Enrico Fermi, Argentinian research reactor
FERMIAC
Fermi filter
Fermi Linux, distributions produced Fermilab
Fermi-Szilárd Neutronic Reactor, US patent 2,708,656
Fermi-ization, method of estimation that involves breaking a problem into component parts, estimating each part separately and then combining the result.  This method tends to produce substantially more accurate answers, even with components that are largely unknown, than less systematic approaches.

Other
Enrico Fermi Award
Enrico Fermi Professorship in Physics at Columbia University
Fermi Paradox (album), an album by Tub Ring
Fermi Paradox, a song by Avenged Sevenfold
Fermi Project, a philanthropic organization 
Fermi, a large lunar crater
Fermi and Frost, a science fiction short story by Frederik Pohl with themes including the Fermi paradox
The Fermi Paradox Is Our Business Model, a science fiction short story by Charlie Jane Anders
8103 Fermi (1994 BE), a main-belt asteroid
Fermi, a metro station in Turin
EUR Fermi, a station of the Rome Metro
Enrico Fermi High School, a high school located in Enfield, Connecticut
 Instituto Italiano Enrico Fermi in Panama.
 Schools, squares and streets in almost all Italian towns and villages
A Nuker class character in Quanta;Next.

References

Fermi
Enrico Fermi